Joseba Garmendia Elorriaga (born 4 October 1985) is a Spanish former professional footballer who played as a midfielder.

Club career
Garmendia was born in Basauri, Biscay. A product of Athletic Bilbao's famed youth system, he made his first-team debut in 2006–07's first matchday, a 1–1 local derby against Real Sociedad. 

During his three-season spell with the Basques, Garmendia never appeared in more than 18 La Liga matches. He scored his first goal in the competition on 10 December 2006, helping to a 4–2 home win over Recreativo de Huelva.

In late July 2009, Garmendia bought out the remaining year of his contract and moved to Segunda División club CD Numancia in a 2+1 deal – former Athletic teammate Iñigo Vélez also made the move. He continued competing at that level the following years, with Girona FC and CD Mirandés, suffering an anterior cruciate ligament injury whilst at the service of the former that sidelined him for several months.

On 1 September 2014, Garmendia joined Real Murcia, recently relegated to the Segunda División B. He continued playing in the lower leagues until his retirement, which was confirmed in May 2022 at the age of 36.

References

External links

1985 births
Living people
People from Basauri
Sportspeople from Biscay
Spanish footballers
Footballers from the Basque Country (autonomous community)
Association football midfielders
La Liga players
Segunda División players
Segunda División B players
Tercera División players
Segunda Federación players
CD Basconia footballers
Bilbao Athletic footballers
Athletic Bilbao footballers
CD Numancia players
Girona FC players
CD Mirandés footballers
Real Murcia players
SD Amorebieta footballers
UD Socuéllamos players
SD Formentera players